Vikram Goud is an Indian film producer and politician from Hyderabad, India. He is known for producing films such as Ishq and Gunde Jaari Gallanthayyinde. Goud began his career in the film industry in 2012 with Nithiin starrer Ishq, which received positive reviews and was a box office success. He then went on to produce the romantic comedy film Gunde Jaari Gallanthayyinde in 2013, which also received positive reviews and was a commercial success.

In addition to his work in the film industry, Goud is also actively involved in politics. He is a Legislator from the Goshamahal Constituency, and is known for his community service and his efforts to improve the welfare of his constituents. Throughout his career, Goud has been recognized for his contributions to both the film industry and to politics.

Career 
Vikram Goud was active participant in politics since his college days, in 2000 he was Elected as Hyderabad City Vice President of National Students' Union of India while pursuing his intermediate, and went on to become General Secretary. In 2011, he was elected as General Secretary of Youth Congress of then Andhra Pradesh. He contested as a Greater Hyderabad mayoral candidate from Indian National Congress in 2016 and in 2020, he was in-charge of Goshamahal Assembly constituency before he moved to Bharatiya Janata Party.

In late 2022, he was speculated as a prospective candidate to represent Goshamahal as a successor of Raja Singh competing alongside Corporator Shankar Rao and Bhagwanth Rao.

Controversy 
In 2017, Vikram Goud was attacked and suffered gun shot wounds Police said they do not know whether Vikram Goud was attacked by anybody or whether it was a suicide bid. Investigation revealed that the three-member gang, who took money to shoot Vikram, after the incident, they fled from the city, and police traced their whereabouts through CCTV footage from Outer Ring Road (ORR). TV reports say that Vikram Goud staged the drama to threaten his father, Mukesh Goud and to get off from the financiers. They say that Vikram was in huge debts.

Early career

Filmography

Awards

References 

Film producers from Hyderabad, India
Politicians from Hyderabad, India
Year of birth missing (living people)
Living people